Redefine (also styled as re·de·fine) is the third studio album by American rock band Soil. It was released on March 23, 2004 via J Records. Redefine was Soil's final album with vocalist Ryan McCombs before he left the band in October that year. He would later rejoin the band in 2011. It was also Soil's last release through J Records after the band was dropped following the Sony/BMG merger.

The album peaked at number 78 on the Billboard 200 chart, selling 14,454 copies in its first week. and included the single and video for "Redefine" which charted higher than any previous single of the band. The track "Pride" was featured in the video game Madden NFL 2004. According to the album booklet, the track "Remember" was dedicated to the memory of Dave Williams, the original lead singer of Drowning Pool.

Touring
Soil toured for a year in promotion of Redefine which included a European schedule with Drowning Pool and Damageplan. Touring ended in late 2004 when Ryan McCombs suddenly left the group. This forced the cancelation of future shows including a mini tour with Sevendust, a festival with Damageplan, and a UK tour. Soil was also scheduled to perform with Damageplan on December 10 of the same year, but ultimately did not, due to the murder of Damageplan guitarist Dimebag Darrell two days earlier.

Track listing

Personnel

Soil
 Ryan McCombs – lead vocals
 Adam Zadel – lead guitar, backing vocals
 Shaun Glass – rhythm guitar
 Tim King – bass guitar
 Tom Schofield – drums

Other 
 Johnny K – production and engineering
 Nick Raskulinecz – production and engineering of the songs "Pride" and "Something Real"
 Randy Staub – mixing
 Tom Baker – mastering

Chart positions

Album

Singles

References

2004 albums
Soil (American band) albums
J Records albums
Albums produced by Nick Raskulinecz
Albums recorded at Sound City Studios